Pattenburg is an unincorporated community located within Union Township in Hunterdon County, New Jersey, United States.

The Norfolk Southern Railway's Lehigh Line (formerly the mainline of the Lehigh Valley Railroad), runs through Pattenburg and Lehigh Line's south entrance to the Pattenburg Tunnel is located in Pattenburg.

Notable people

People who were born in, residents of, or otherwise closely associated with Union Township include:
 Scott Bradlee (born 1981) is an American musician, pianist, and arranger, best known as founder of Postmodern Jukebox as well as composer and arranger for several television programs including the Tony Awards.

 Daniel Karcher (born 1964) is an on-air broadcast announcer and film designer, best known as host for WBGO and production of The Blair Witch Project and Family Guy.

References

Union Township, Hunterdon County, New Jersey
Unincorporated communities in Hunterdon County, New Jersey
Unincorporated communities in New Jersey